Richard Patrick DeWine (born February 22, 1968) is an American attorney, politician and jurist serving as an associate justice of the Ohio Supreme Court since 2017. He is the son of former U.S. Senator and Ohio Attorney General and current Governor Mike DeWine.

Early life and education
DeWine is the oldest of eight children born to Mike DeWine and Frances Struewing. DeWine grew up in the Mount Lookout neighborhood of Cincinnati. After earning a Bachelor of Arts degree from Miami University, he graduated cum laude from the University of Michigan Law School in 1994 and was inducted into the Order of the Coif.

Career 
DeWine served as a member of the Cincinnati City Council and the Hamilton County Board of Commissioners . He was first elected to city council in 1999, finishing sixth with 27,745 votes in a field of 20 (with the top nine elected). He was re-elected in 2001 (finishing second with 43,191 votes in a field of 26) and in 2003 (finishing sixth with 26,573 votes in a field of 26). He resigned from city council in order to take his seat on the Hamilton County Commission. Chris Monzel, a Republican who had lost his council seat in the last election, was appointed to fill out DeWine's term on city council.

DeWine was a candidate in the June 14, 2005 Republican primary for the Ohio's 2nd congressional district special election after Rob Portman resigned to become U.S. Trade Representative. He placed fourth behind Jean Schmidt, Bob McEwen, and Tom Brinkman. His campaign for Congress suffered after allegations of infidelity surfaced against DeWine.

State judicial career
DeWine sought and won election to the Hamilton County Court of Common Pleas in 2008, defeating Norma Holt Davis in the general election. He subsequently won a seat on the 1st District Ohio District Courts of Appeals in 2012, defeating Bruce Whitman in the November 6, 2012 election.

DeWine took his seat on the Appellate bench in January 2013 after defeating Bruce Whitman in the November 2012 general election. He won an uncontested Republican primary election in March 2016 for a seat on the Ohio Supreme Court commencing January 2, 2017. In November 2016 he won election to that seat over his Democratic opponent. Prior to his election as Associate Justice, he served as a Judge on the Ohio 1st District Court of Appeals and the Hamilton County Court of Common Pleas and was an associate for 13 years with the firm of Keating Muething & Klekamp.

In August 2021, DeWine withdrew from the contest to be nominated as Ohio Supreme Court chief justice in succession to Chief Justice Maureen O'Connor.

Involvement in legislative redistricting cases 
Justice DeWine refused to recuse from a case in which his father, Governor Mike DeWine, was a party and helped author the minority opinion that would have upheld an unconstitutional gerrymander approved by the Ohio Redistricting Commission, of which Governor DeWine is the chairman.

Personal life
DeWine's first marriage ended in divorce in 2003. He and his ex-wife have three sons. He was married to his second wife, Rhonda DeWine, from 2010 until 2019 when she filed for divorce.

References

External links
League of Women Voters page on the race
Campaign site
Ohio Supreme Court

1968 births
21st-century American judges
American people of Irish descent
Cincinnati City Council members
Justices of the Ohio Supreme Court
Living people
Miami University alumni
Ohio lawyers
Ohio Republicans
People from Hamilton County, Ohio
University of Michigan Law School alumni